Buffalo Grove station is on Metra's North Central Service in Buffalo Grove, Illinois. In Metra's zone-based fare system, Buffalo Grove is in zone F. As of 2018, Buffalo Grove is the 76th busiest of Metra's 236 non-downtown stations, with an average of 695 weekday boardings. This makes it the most-trafficked station on the North Central Service.

As of December 12, 2022, Buffalo Grove is served by all 14 trains (seven in each direction) on weekdays.

The station contains a large parking lot off of Commerce Drive, which itself is a cul-de-sac off of Deerfield Parkway. The station is a part of the Sidney Mathias Transportation Center.

Bus connections
Pace
 234 Wheeling/Des Plaines
 272 Milwaukee Avenue North
 626 Skokie Valley Limited

References

External links 

Metra stations in Illinois
Railway stations in Lake County, Illinois
Railway stations in the United States opened in 1996